Herbert Obst (born 26 June 1936) is a Canadian fencer. He competed in the individual and team foil and épée events at the 1972 Summer Olympics.

References

1936 births
Living people
Canadian male fencers
Olympic fencers of Canada
Fencers at the 1972 Summer Olympics
German emigrants to Canada
People from Strzegom
People from the Province of Silesia